"Going Backwards" is a song by English electronic band Depeche Mode from their fourteenth studio album Spirit. It was released as the album's second single on 23 June 2017. The cover art was designed by Anton Corbijn. A physical CD and vinyl release was released on 15 September 2017. A live video was released on 22 June 2017.

Track listing 
Digital single
"Going Backwards" (Album Version) – 5:43
"Going Backwards" (Highline Sessions Version) – 5:27
CD single / digital download
"Going Backwards" (Radio Edit) – 3:51   
"Going Backwards" (Chris Liebing Mix) – 9:07
"Going Backwards" (Solomun Extended Radio Remix) – 8:25
"Going Backwards" (The Belleville Three Full Vocal Mix) – 6:44
"Going Backwards" (Point Point Remix) – 4:32    
"Going Backwards" (Chris Liebing Burn Slow Mix) – 7:08
"Going Backwards" (Maya Jane Coles Remix) – 5:57
"Poison Heart" (Soulsavers Re-Work) – 3:45
Double LP Vinyl single
"Going Backwards" (Chris Liebing Mix) – 9:07
"Going Backwards" (Solomun Club Remix) – 7:53
"Going Backwards" (The Belleville Three Deep Bass) – 5:58
"Going Backwards" (Chris Liebing Burn Slow Mix) – 7:08
"Going Backwards" (Point Point Remix) – 4:32
"You Move" (Latroit Remix) – 4:17
"Poison Heart" (Soulsavers Re-Work) – 3:45
Claptone Remix
"Going Backwards" (Claptone Remix) – 6:44

Personnel 
 David Gahan - lead vocals
 Martin Gore - guitar, keyboards, synthesizers, backing vocals
 Andrew Fletcher - keyboards, synthesizers, backing vocals
 James Ford - drums
 Kurt Uenala, Matrixxman - programming

Charts

References

External links
 Single information from the official Depeche Mode web site
 Chart performance in France
 Chart Performance in Germany

2017 singles
Depeche Mode songs
Songs written by Martin Gore
Song recordings produced by James Ford (musician)
2017 songs
Columbia Records singles